The Trade Boards Act 1909 was a piece of social legislation passed in the United Kingdom in 1909. It provided for the creation of boards which could set minimum wage criteria that were legally enforceable.  It was expanded and updated in the Trade Boards Act 1918. The main provision was to set minimum wages in certain trades with historically low wages, often due to a surplus of available workers due to the widespread employment of workers or lack of skills needed for employment.

At first it applied to four industries: chain-making, ready-made tailoring, paper-box making, machine-made lace making, and finishing trades.  It was later expanded in 1912: mining and then to other industries with a preponderance of unskilled manual labour.

Debates
Winston Churchill, MP, put the argument for the legislation as follows:

See also
UK labour law
Trade Boards Act 1918
Wages Councils Act 1945
National Minimum Wage Act 1998
S Webb and B Webb, Industrial Democracy (1898)
Liberal reforms

Notes

Further reading
 Blackburn, Sheila. "Ideology and social policy: the origins of the Trade Boards Act." The Historical Journal 34#1 (1991): 43-64.
S Webb and B Webb, Industrial Democracy (Longmans 1902)

External links
Trade Boards Act 1909 on Wikisource

United Kingdom Acts of Parliament 1909
United Kingdom labour law
1909 in labor relations